Oxygyne triandra is a species of plant in the Burmanniaceae family. It is endemic to Cameroon.  Its natural habitat is subtropical or tropical dry forests. It is threatened by habitat loss.

References

Burmanniaceae
Flora of Cameroon
Critically endangered plants
Taxonomy articles created by Polbot